Institute of Science & Technology (informally IST CK Town, IST CKT or simply IST) is a Private engineering and management oriented institute of higher education located in West Bengal, India. It is an institution recognized by Directorate of Technical Education, West Bengal. It is affiliated with West Bengal University of Technology (Wbut) and West Bengal State Council Of Technical Education (WBSCTE). The institute is also recognised by Government of West Bengal and all its courses are duly approved by All India Council of Technical Education (AICTE).

Campus
Located 18 km away from the Prayag Film City, IST is situated beside the State Highway 4, in the outskirts of Chandrakona Town of West Midnapore district. It accommodates an administrative block, academic blocks, training and placement cell, resource center, workshops, laboratories, food court, playgrounds and hostel facilities.

Academics
IST imparts education in various engineering and management disciplines. Undergraduate courses award B.Tech in various engineering and technological fields, while postgraduate courses award M.Tech. The institute also offers diploma studies (Polytechnic) in various engineering fields.

Apart from these, the faculty of technology is also offering Bachelor of Computer Applications (BCA) and Master of Computer Applications (MCA) degree courses. The institute also offers Bachelor of Business Administration (BBA) Bachelor of Hospital Management (BHM) degree courses at the undergraduate level.

Admission
Admission to the B.Tech courses on the basis of West Bengal Joint Entrance Examination and All India Engineering Entrance Examination (JEE). Admission to other courses are based on criteria decided by the Academic Council of the University. There is a provision for direct admission for a limited number of Non-resident Indian/Foreign National students.

Culture
The college hosts annual events, which include the Teacher's Day & Freshers Program and Annual Sports.

See also

References

External links
 
University Grants Commission
National Assessment and Accreditation Council

Universities and colleges in Paschim Medinipur district
Colleges affiliated to West Bengal University of Technology
Educational institutions established in 2005
Maulana Abul Kalam Azad University of Technology
Engineering colleges in West Bengal
2005 establishments in West Bengal